Monkeys in Winter is a 2006 Bulgarian film directed by Milena Andonova.

The film took part in a number of film festivals and won a series of rewards, the most significant of them are following:
 Karlovy Vary International Film Festival, 2006 - best film in competition program "East of West"
 Bulgarian Film Festival Golden Rose, Varna, Bulgaria, September 2006 - the Grand Prize for Bulgarian cinema and other rewards (for the 3 actresses in the main roles)
 National Film Center, Sofia - Best Feature Film for 2006

It was Bulgaria's submission to the 79th Academy Awards for the Academy Award for Best Foreign Language Film, but was not accepted as a nominee.

See also

List of submissions to the 79th Academy Awards for Best Foreign Language Film

References

External links

2006 films
Bulgarian drama films